Dinner with Dani is an American talk show hosted by pornographic actress Dani Daniels on Amazon Prime Video. The show premiered on September 23, 2018, and is distributed and produced by New Media Productions. The show records in New York City at Giulietta's Cantina Club in West Village.

Background 
The show first aired September 23, 2018. The show is hosted by award-winning pornographic actress Dani Daniels. Many of the guests are fellow pornographic actors and actress as well as other influential people in the season one finale actor and comedian Gilbert Gottfried was one of the guests.

The show is filmed in New York City more specifically at Giulietta's Cantina Club in West Village.

Production 
The show is co-produced by New Media Productions and D. Daniel Enterprises. In 2018 and 2019, show producers have included Dani Daniels, Victor Cipolla, Edward Garcia and Jim Mendrinos.

The show is shot with a multicamera setup and is in the 1080i high-definition television full color picture format.

Episodes

Season 1

International broadcast 
The show is available through Amazon Prime Video worldwide and through Just Watch in the following countries: United Kingdom, France, Spain, Australia, New Zealand, Brazil, Japan, Germany and the Netherlands.

References

External links 

 Official website
 
 Watch Dinner with Dani on Amazon Video

2010s American television talk shows
Amazon Prime Video original programming
2018 American television series debuts